Love Letters of a Star is a 1936 American mystery film directed by Milton Carruth and Lewis R. Foster and written by Milton Carruth, Lewis R. Foster, and James Mulhauser. The film stars Henry Hunter, Polly Rowles, C. Henry Gordon, Walter Coy, Hobart Cavanaugh, Mary Alice Rice, and Ralph Forbes. The film was released on November 8, 1936, by Universal Pictures.

Plot

Cast

References

External links
 

1936 films
American mystery films
1936 mystery films
Universal Pictures films
Films directed by Lewis R. Foster
Films directed by Milton Carruth
American black-and-white films
1930s English-language films
1930s American films